Santa Maria Island Station (also known as SMA or Montes das Flores, Hill of Flowers) is an ESTRACK satellite ground station in the Azores,  from the town of Vila do Porto on the island of Santa Maria.

Station currently operates a 5.5m S-band antenna capable of receiving signals in the 2200-2300 MHz range, the first one in the ESTRACK network with launch tracking capability. It covers a large portion of the Atlantic ocean and during the Ariane 5 launches, it acquires signals until the upper stage engine cut-off. Future upgrades for SMA will include an X-band antenna working in the range of 8025-8400 MHz.

Construction of the station was completed in January 2008 under Ariane Development Programme in an agreement between ESA and the Portuguese government. A reason for building an additional station was tracking of the medium inclination Ariane 5 launches and upcoming Vega along with Soyuz from Guiana Space Centre. The first launch tracked by the newly built site was Ariane 5 ES flight V-181 lifting Automated Transfer Vehicle Jules Verne in March 2008.

When not used for launch tracking station is used in CleanSeaNet and MARISS service for Copernicus Programme

References

European Space Agency
ESTRACK facilities
Buildings and structures in Vila do Porto